Kate Lilley (born 1960) is a contemporary Australian poet and academic.

Early life
Kate Lilley was born in Perth, Western Australia in 1960 and moved to Sydney with her family. She is the daughter of writers Dorothy Hewett and Merv Lilley, and sister of Rozanna Lilley, Joe Flood, Michael Flood and Tom Flood.  

After studying at the University of Sydney, she completed a PhD at University of London on masculine elegy, and from 1986 to 1989 was a postdoctoral Research Fellow at St Hilda's College Oxford University working on Seventeenth Century Women's Writing.

Career
Lilley is a scholar of queer, feminist textual theory and history, from 17th century women’s writing to contemporary poetry and poetics. She edited The Blazing World by Margaret Cavendish (Penguin Classics, 1994).

She published Versary, her first volume of poems, in 2002, Ladylike in 2012, and Tilt in 2018. In 2010 she edited Selected Poems of Dorothy Hewett for UWA Press.

Lilley had a "featured cameo" as Vera Newby in the film The Chant of Jimmie Blacksmith.

She has been an Associate Professor in the Department of English at the University of Sydney, where she directed the Creative Writing program from 2013 to 2021. She is now a 'poet-scholar at large' and the poetry editor of Southerly magazine.

Awards and recognition
Winner 2002 Grace Leven Prize for Versary
Winner 2019 Victorian Premier's Prize for Poetry for Tilt

Works
Poetry
Versary. (Salt, 2002) 
Round Vienna. (Vagabond Press, 2011) 
Ladylike. (UWA Publishing, 2012) 
Tilt. (Vagabond, 2018) 

Edited
Margaret Cavendish The Blazing World and Other Writings. (Penguin, 1994)
Dorothy Hewett Selected Poems. (UWA Press, 2010)

References

External links
Kate Lilley Contents page Poems & essays at Australian Literature Resources
2 short poems at Snorkel Magazine

1960 births
Living people
Australian poets
Academic staff of the University of Sydney
Alumni of the University of London
Australian women poets